The 1958 Individual Long Track European Championship was the second edition of the Long Track European Championship. The event was held on 15 June 1958 in Mühldorf, West Germany.

The  title was won by Josef Hofmeister of West Germany.

Venues
1st semi-final - Stockholm , 18 May 1958
2nd semi-final - Scheeßel , 8 June 1958
Final - Mühldorf, 15 June 1958

Final Classification

References 

Sports competitions in Stockholm
Motor
Motor
International sports competitions hosted by West Germany